Naginu may refer to:
 Neginan
 Neygenan